In cosmetics, skin toner or simply toner refers to a lotion, tonic or wash designed to cleanse the skin and shrink the appearance of pores, usually used on the face. It also moisturizes, protects and refreshes the skin. Toners can be applied to the skin in different ways:

 On a cotton round or ball. (This is the most frequently used method.)
 Spraying onto the face.
 By applying a tonic gauze facial mask—a piece of gauze is covered with toner and left on the face for a few minutes.

Some toners may cause some irritation to the skin upon their initial use. Users often apply serum and moisturizer after the toner has dried.

Types of toners

Skin bracers or fresheners 
These are the mildest form of toners; they contain water and a humectant such as glycerine, and little if any alcohol (0–10%).  Humectants help to keep the moisture in the upper layers of the epidermis by preventing it from evaporating.  A popular example of this is rosewater.

These toners are the gentlest to the skin, and are most suitable for use on dry, dehydrated, sensitive and normal skins.  It may give a burning sensation to sensitive skin.

Skin tonics 
These are slightly stronger and contain a small quantity of alcohol (up to 20%), water and a humectant ingredient.  Orange flower water is an example of a skin tonic.  Skin tonics are suitable for use on normal, combination, and oily skin.

Acid Toners 
These are a strong form of toner that typically contains alpha hydroxy acid and or beta hydroxy acid. Acid toners are formulated with the intent of chemically exfoliating the skin. Glycolic, Lactic, and Mandelic acids are the most commonly used alpha hydroxy acids, best suited to exfoliate the surface of the skin. Salicylic acid is the most commonly used beta hydroxy acid best for exfoliating into the deeper layers of the skin.

Astringents 
These are the strongest form of toner and contain a high proportion of alcohol (20–60%), antiseptic ingredients, water, and a humectant ingredient.  These can be irritating and damaging to the skin as they can remove excess protective lipids as well as denature proteins in the skin when a high percentage of alcohol is used.

References

Skin care